A villanelle is a nineteen-line poetic form consisting of five tercets followed by a quatrain.

Villanelle may also refer to:

Fiction
 Villanelle (character), a fictional assassin in BBC America's Killing Eve and in related Luke Jennings novels
 "La Villanelle", a perfume in the Killing Eve episode "Sorry Baby"
 Codename Villanelle, a 2018 novel by British author Luke Jennings

Music
 Villanelle (Poulenc), 1934 chamber music by Francis Poulenc
 "Villanelle", a 1893 song by Eva Dell'Acqua

See also
 Killing Eve: No Tomorrow, a 2019 fictional thriller novel sequel to Codename Villanelle by Luke Jennings
 Theocritus: a villanelle, a poem by Oscar Wilde
 Villanella, an Italian vocal music form